The year 1878 in archaeology involved some significant events.

Excavations
Christos Stamatakis excavates the Treasury of Atreus, Mycenae, Greece (built c.1300–1200 BC).
Excavation of Vinovia Roman fort in the north of England begins.
 September - Carl Humann begins excavations at Pergamon.

Publications
 American Antiquarian founded by Rev. Stephen D. Peet.
 Isaac Fletcher - "The Archaeology of the West Cumberland Coal Trade", Transactions of the Cumberland and Westmorland Antiquarian & Archaeological Society.

Finds
 The Balawat Gates are discovered in Assyria  by Hormuzd Rassam.
 31 Iguanodon skeletons are discovered in a coal mine at Bernissart, Belgium.
 Pergamon Altar.
 Birka female Viking warrior excavated by Hjalmar Stolpe on the Swedish island of Björkö but believed at this time to be male.
 Bayou St. John submarine.

Other events
 September 12 - 'Cleopatra's Needle' is erected beside the River Thames in London.

Awards

Births
 December 29 - Félix-Marie Abel, French biblical archaeologist (d. 1953)

Deaths

References

Archaeology
Archaeology by year
Archaeology
Archaeology